Breuker is a surname. Notable people

 Henk Breuker (1914–2003), Dutch master turner
 Willem Breuker (1944–2010), Dutch jazz bandleader

See also 
 Roger De Breuker (born 1940), Belgian professional road bicycle racer. 
 Tim Breukers (born 1987), Dutch professional footballer